Events from the year 1997 in South Korea.

Incumbents
President: Kim Young-sam 
Prime Minister: Lee Soo-sung (until 4 March), Goh Kun (starting 4 March)

Events

 May 10–19 – The East Asian Games are held in Pusan.
 Korean Air Flight 801.
 1997 Asian financial crisis.

Births
 January 3 – Donghyuk, member of boy group iKON
 January 31 – Miyeon, songwriter and a member in girl group (G)I-dle
 February 1 – Jihyo, a member in girl group Twice
 February 11 – Rosé, New Zealand singer and member of Blackpink
 February 14 – Jaehyun, member of boy group NCT
 February 18 – DK, member of Seventeen
 March 27 – Lisa, Thai rapper and member of Blackpink
 March 30 – Cha Eun-woo, actor, model and singer in boy group Astro
 March 31 – Junhoe, member of boy group iKON
 April 6 – Mingyu, member of Seventeen
 May 24 – Yves, member of Loona
 May 30 – Eunha, actress and member of girl group GFriend and VIVIZ
 August 13 – Yeo Jin-goo, actor
 September 1 – Jungkook, songwriter, record producer and singer in boy group BTS
 October 4 – Yuju, member of girl group GFriend
 October 23 – Minnie, Thai songwriter, record producer, actress, and singer in girl group (G)I-dle
 November 7 – The8, Chinese singer and member of boy group Seventeen
 November 17 – Yugyeom, member of boy group GOT7
 December 1 – Jung Chae-yeon, singer and actress, member of I.O.I

See also
List of South Korean films of 1997
Years in Japan
Years in North Korea

References

 
South Korea
Years of the 20th century in South Korea
1990s in South Korea
South Korea